Robert Baldock (or de Baldock; died 28 May 1327) was the Lord Privy Seal and Lord Chancellor of England, during the reign of King Edward II of England.

Career 
Baldock was archdeacon of Middlesex when he was named Controller of the Wardrobe and Lord Privy Seal on 27 January 1320 and then Prebend of Aylesbury in August 1320. He remained Lord Privy Seal until 8 July 1323, before being named Lord Chancellor of England on 20 August 1323.

Baldock was elected Bishop of Norwich on 23 July 1325, but before consecration resigned the office on 3 September 1325 to avoid a collision between the pope and the King.

In October 1326, Baldock was one of the small number of supporters who fled London with King Edward when Queen Isabella and Roger Mortimer invaded. He remained with the King and the Despensers, the King's particular favorites, in their flight across England to the Despensers' lands in Wales, and was one of the last handful who attempted to cross to Ireland and failed. He and the King remained fugitives until their hiding place was revealed. Baldock lost his offices and was imprisoned in November 1326.

Death
Unlike the Despensers, who suffered quick trials and executions, Baldock was a clergyman, and so in February 1327 was sent to London for trial by fellow clergy. He was placed under house arrest at Hereford Palace (the Bishop of Hereford's London residence). A mob broke into the house, severely beat him, and threw him into Newgate Prison, where he was murdered by some of the inmates.

Citations

References

 
 
 
 
 
 

1327 deaths
Archdeacons of Middlesex
Lords Privy Seal
Lord chancellors of England
Bishops of Norwich